Antonio de Nebrija (14445 July 1522) was the most influential Spanish humanist of his era. He wrote poetry, commented on literary works, and encouraged the study of classical languages and literature, but his most important contributions were in the fields of grammar and lexicography. Nebrija was the author of the Spanish Grammar (Gramática de la lengua castellana, 1492) and the first dictionary of the Spanish language (1495). His grammar is the first published grammar study of any modern European language. His chief works were published and republished many times during and after his life and his scholarship had a great influence for more than a century, both in Spain and in the expanding Spanish Empire.

Name
Nebrija was baptized .

Biography

Nebrija was born into an hidalgo family in Nebrixa, a town now called Lebrija in the province of Seville. His parents were Juan Martínez de Cala and Catalina de Xarana. He was the second of five children. There is some uncertainty about his date of birth. Nebrija wrote that he was born the year before the Battle of Olmedo in 1445, putting his birthday in 1444 but elsewhere he makes other references that would contradict this date. Traditionally, 1444 has been accepted as his year of birth.

At age fourteen, Nebrija enrolled at the University of Salamanca, where he studied mathematics, philosophy, law and theology. These latter topics earned him a scholarship from the bishopric of Seville to study theology at the Royal College of Spain in Bologna. Little is known about his studies in Italy except that he was inspired by the works of the Italian humanists, especially Lorenzo Valla. After ten years in Italy Nebrija returned to Spain armed with the new concepts of Renaissance humanism.

Once back in Spain, Nebrija served Alonso de Fonseca y Ulloa, archbishop of Seville, for three years. When Fonseca died in 1473, Nebrija returned to the University of Salamanca as a lecturer. In 1476 he was appointed First Chair of Grammar and in 1481 he published his first work, the Introductiones latinae (Introduction to Latin), a textbook on Latin grammar and literature. The first printing of 1,000 copies quickly sold out and was reprinted dozens of times in his lifetime.

He married Isabel Montesino de Solís in 1487 and eventually fathered seven children. When Juan de Zúñiga, the master of the Order of Alcántara, offered him patronage, Nebrija quit the university in Salamanca and moved to Badajoz, where he lived for the next twelve years.

After the success of his Latin textbook, Nebrija's literary scholarship turned to focus on Castilian rather than classical languages. In 1492 he published Gramática de la lengua castellana (Grammar of the Castilian Language), which he dedicated to Queen Isabella I of Castile. His book was one of the first to codify a European vernacular language, and it ultimately had considerable political and scholarly influence. Nebrija recognized that language played a crucial role in governance of the state. In his dedication he wrote to Isabella that language was "the instrument of empire" and suggested that his grammar would prove useful as the Catholic monarchs conquered peoples who spoke languages other than Castilian.

In 1492 Nebrija also published the Diccionario latino-español (Latin-Spanish Dictionary). It was not the first Latin-Spanish dictionary (Alfonso de Palencia published one in 1490) but it would become hugely influential, in part because a few years later he reversed the order and published his Vocabulario español-latino (Spanish-Latin Vocabulary) in 1495. For the next century, the Spanish-Latin vocabulary continued to evolve with new words and translations. It also served as the basis for other authors developing non-Latin translating dictionaries including Spanish-Arabic (1505), Spanish-Nahuatl (1547) and Spanish-Tagalog (1613).

After publishing his dictionaries Nebrija turned his attention to biblical scholarship. He wanted to improve the text and interpretation of the Bible by using the same critical analysis that Italian humanists had applied to classical literature. Around 1504 he fell under the suspicion of Diego de Deza, the Grand Inquisitor of Spain, who confiscated and destroyed his work. In 1507 Cardinal Jiménez de Cisneros succeeded Deza as inquisitor general. Cisneros allowed Nebrija to resume his biblical studies and he eventually published a series of works that used the techniques of humanist scholarship to address problems of biblical translation and interpretation. Nebrija served briefly on the editorial committee assembled by Jiménez to prepare the Complutensian Polyglot Bible. He clashed with the more conservative editors, who resisted his humanist approach to translating the Bible. Jiménez supported the conservative viewpoint and Nebrija's input was largely ignored when the finished work was published in 1517.

Nebrija wrote or translated a large number of other works on a variety of subjects, including theology, law, archaeology, pedagogy, and commentaries on Sedulius and Persius.

Nebrija died on 5 July 1522 in Alcalá de Henares, Spain. His possible grandson Antonio de Lebrija was conquistador in Colombia and treasurer of the Spanish conquest of the Muisca expedition.

Works
Introductiones latinae, 1481
Gramática de la lengua castellana, 1492
Diccionario latino-español, 1492
Vocabulario español-latino, ca. 1495
Iuris civilis lexicon, 1506
Artis rhetoricae, 1515
Reglas de ortografía española, 1517
Posthumously published Reglas de ortografía en la lengua castellana, 1523

Notes

References
English

Nebrija, Antonio De; Armillas-Tiseyra, Magalí (2016/01). "On Language and Empire: The Prologue to Grammar of the Castilian Language (1492)". PMLA. 131 (1): 197–208. 
Spanish

Further reading
Nicolás Antonio, Bibliotheca Hispana Nova, i. 132 (1888)
Prescott, History of Ferdinand and Isabella, i. 410 (note)
Thomas McCrie, The Reformation in Spain in the Sixteenth Century (1829)
 Ivan Illich's essay Vernacular Values on the significance of Nebrija's Grammar

External links

 Etext of Nebrija's Gramática de la lengua castellana
 Prologue to Nebrija's Gramática de la lengua castellana 

1444 births 
1522 deaths
16th-century linguists
16th-century Spanish writers
Complutense University of Madrid alumni
Grammarians from Spain
Linguists from Spain
Linguists of Spanish
People from Lebrija
Spanish Latinists
Spanish lexicographers
Spanish Renaissance people
Spanish translators
Translators of the Bible into Spanish
University of Salamanca alumni
Academic staff of the University of Salamanca